Charles F. Flaherty (born October 13, 1938, in Boston, Massachusetts) is a U.S. politician who served as a Democratic member of the Massachusetts House of Representatives from 1967 to 1996. He was the House Majority Leader from 1985 to 1990 and the Speaker of the House from 1991 to 1996.

In 1996, Flaherty agreed to plead guilty to felony tax evasion for submitting false receipts regarding his business expenses.  In addition, he also admitted to civil violations of state conflict of interest law for receiving free vacation housing from lobbyists. He stepped down as house Speaker and was fined $50,000.

See also
 1967–1968 Massachusetts legislature
 1969–1970 Massachusetts legislature
 1971–1972 Massachusetts legislature
 1973–1974 Massachusetts legislature
 1975–1976 Massachusetts legislature
 1977–1978 Massachusetts legislature
 1979–1980 Massachusetts legislature
 1981–1982 Massachusetts legislature
 1983–1984 Massachusetts legislature
 1985–1986 Massachusetts legislature
 1987–1988 Massachusetts legislature
 1989–1990 Massachusetts legislature
 1991–1992 Massachusetts legislature
 1993–1994 Massachusetts legislature
 1995–1996 Massachusetts legislature

References

External links

1938 births
20th-century criminals
American people convicted of tax crimes
Massachusetts politicians convicted of crimes
Living people
Massachusetts Democratic Party chairs
Politicians from Cambridge, Massachusetts
Speakers of the Massachusetts House of Representatives
Democratic Party members of the Massachusetts House of Representatives
American politicians convicted of fraud